The 2014 Perth Glory FC W-League season was the club's seventh participation in the W-League, since the league's formation in 2008.

During this season, the Glory Women broke several W-League records including most points in a single season (30), as well as most goals scored by a player in a single game (5, Kate Gill). Gill also won the Season 7 Golden Boot award for the second time in her W-League career, with a total of 12 goals. They began the season going from strength to strength notching 6 straight wins, their best ever start to a season. 

This was the final season before Perth Glory FC resumed control of the club from Football West. With no premiership trophy being offered by Football Federation Australia, Football West commissioned a trophy when the team won the W-League premiership against Western Sydney Wanderers.

Players

Squad information

Transfers in

Transfers out

Competitions

W-League

Fixtures

League table

Results summary

Results by round

Goal scorers

Awards
 Player of the Week (Round 8) – Caitlin Foord
 Player of the Week (Semi-finals) – Kate Gill

References

External links
 Official Website

Perth Glory FC (A-League Women) seasons
Perth Glory